Article Three may refer to:


Constitutions
 Article Three of the United States Constitution
 First Amendment to the United States Constitution, which was also known as "Article the Third" or "The third article"
 Article 3 of the Constitution of India
 Article 3 of the Constitution of Ireland
 Article Three of the Constitution of Puerto Rico
 Article 3, of the North Atlantic Treaty which brought NATO into existence

Human rights
 Article 3 of the European Convention on Human Rights
 Common Article 3 of the Geneva Convention, 1949

Other
 The Article 3, a musical album by Me'shell Ndegeocello

See also
 Article (disambiguation)